is a Japanese footballer who plays for Vanraure Hachinohe from 2023.

Career 

On 14 January 2021, Himeno announcement officially permanent transfer to Kataller Toyama for 2021 season. He leave from the club in 2022 after two years at Toyama.

On 24 December 2022, Himeno joined to J3 club, Vanraure Hachinohe for upcoming 2023 season.

Career statistics 

Updated to the end 2022 season.

Club

Honours 

Oita Trinita
 J3 League: 2016

References

External links

Profile at Oita Trinita

1996 births
Living people
Association football people from Ōita Prefecture
Japanese footballers
J2 League players
J3 League players
Japan Football League players
Oita Trinita players
Verspah Oita players
Thespakusatsu Gunma players
Fujieda MYFC players
Kataller Toyama players
Vanraure Hachinohe players
Association football midfielders